The QJZ-89, also known as the Type 89 heavy machine gun, is a heavy machine gun designed in the People's Republic of China and fires the Soviet 12.7×108mm ammunition.

History
In the early 1980s, Chinese firearms designers received scattered information from Soviet publications regarding the Soviet Union's adoption of a new heavy machine gun called the NSV. Astonished by the misinterpreted capability of the NSV, Chinese designers began to develop a comparable weapon system. Only after the development ended did they realized the  weight figure didn't include the tripod.

The weapon features a hybrid gas and recoil operated action. The gas system cycles the bolt group with the receiver recoils inside the outer gun housing to decrease peak recoil. The gun uses a direct impingement gas system, similar to Type 85 machine gun. Type 89 was named "lightweight heavy machine gun" due to its lightweight gun and tripod. 

The gun and tripod together only weigh , which is even lighter than the  Russian Kord machine gun on a bipod mount.

Design
The QJZ-89 has low weight through a combination gas/recoil action usually seen on autocannons, where gas unlocks the breech while recoil operates the feed and decreases the peak recoil forces induced on the housing and mount. Its direct impingement gas system is likely based from the Type 77.

China has reportedly developed 12.7 mm armor piercing discarding sabot (APDS) ammunition for the QJZ-89, similar to U.S. saboted light armor penetrator rounds, increasing performance against light armored vehicles.

Users

: Used on Dongfeng EQ2050 during State Flag Day parade in 2022

Non-State Actors
 United Wa State Army

See also
 Type 85 machine gun
 W85 heavy machine gun
 QJZ-171
 M2 Browning
 XM312
 Kord machine gun

References

Cold War weapons of China
Machine guns of the People's Republic of China
Heavy machine guns
12.7×108 mm machine guns